University of Pretoria Football Club, also known as Tuks FC, is a South African association football club based in the  Hatfield suburb of Pretoria that represents the University of Pretoria. They currently play in the National First Division.

History

The University established the Tuks Football Academy in 2002, originally playing in the SAFA Gauteng South Division. In the 2003–04 season the University acquired Pretoria City FC's second division status, subsequently winning the Vodacom League play-offs and being promoted to the NFD in 2004–05. In the 2006–07 season the club qualified for the Mvela Golden League play-offs. In the 2008–09 season the club was a Nedbank Cup finalist losing to Premier Soccer League team Moroka Swallows 0–1.

Following the 2011–12 season University of Pretoria gained promotion to the PSL "top flight in South African Football" with Stephen Haupt as the head coach.

In the 2014–15 season they finished 13th in the PSL, and the following 2015–16 season they finished 15th. They finished at the bottom of the Promotional Playoff log without a win and were relegated to the NFD. In the 2016–17 season they finished 12th in the NFD. The following 2017–18 season saw a slight improvement, finishing  10th, and the 2018–19 season saw the club finish 14th in the NFD.

Honours
Second Division Gauteng Stream: 2003–04
Second Division National Play-offs: 2004
National First Division: 2011–12

Club records
Most starts:  Washington Arubi 31
Most goals:  Mame Niang 10
Most starts in a season:  Washington Arubi 31 (2012–13)
Most goals in a season:  Mame Niang 10 (2012–13)
Record victory: 5–1 vs Ajax Cape Town (29/9/12, PSL)
Record defeat: 0–5 vs Stellenbosch (31/03/2019, NFD)

Premier Soccer League record
2012–13 – 8th

Shirt sponsor & kit manufacturer
Shirt sponsor: None
Kit manufacturer: Umbro

Club officials/Technical team
Chairman:  Prof. Antonie de Klerk
CEO:  Rendani Mulaudzi
General manager:  Kenneth Neluvhalani
Team manager:  Graham Oosthuis
Coach:  Steve Barker
Assistant coaches:  &  Selaotse MosalaGoalkeeper coach:  Tendai TanyanyiwaFitness trainer:  Sbusiso Mnyamezeli'''

References

External links
 
 Premier Soccer League
 PSL Club Info
 South African Football Association
 Confederation of African Football

University of Pretoria
University and college soccer clubs in South Africa
National First Division clubs
Soccer clubs in Pretoria
Association football clubs established in 2003
Premier Soccer League clubs
SAFA Second Division clubs
2003 establishments in South Africa